The Sons of Daniel Boone (sometimes called the Society of the Sons of Daniel Boone), later the Boy Pioneers of America, was a youth program developed by Daniel Carter Beard in 1905 based on the American frontiersman. When Dan Beard joined the Boy Scouts of America (BSA) in 1910 as one of their national Scout commissioners, he merged his group into the fledgling BSA.

Background
Boys were organized into groups called forts. The officers of the fort took on names of frontiersmen and had specific insignia:

The uniform of the boys was based on the fringed buckskin outfit of the frontiersman. There were no ranks or advancement, but boys could earn notches and top notches for achievements in different areas.

Beard first promoted the program in his column in Recreation Magazine starting in March 1905. He then moved over to Woman's Home Companion (WHC) in April 1906. When he left that magazine in 1909 and moved to Pictorial Review, he was forced to rename the program Boy Pioneers of America because WHC felt they owned the name.

A handbook for the program wasn't published until 1909, as Boy Pioneers: Sons of Daniel Boone.

In 2006 Great Rivers Council in Missouri established a summer camp honor society at Hohn Scout Reservation and Camp Thunderbird named Sons of Daniel Boone, following some of the original writings of Daniel Carter Beard. Since its inception over 600 Scouts have become honor members.

References

External links
 Boy Pioneers on-line copy of the SDB's handbook, published in 1909.
  The Sons of Daniel Boone/Boy Pioneers Uniforms
 Columbia Encyclopedia entry on Dan Beard
 Great Rivers Council Sons of Daniel Boone Society

Associations related to the Boy Scouts of America
Non-aligned Scouting organizations in the United States
Cultural depictions of Daniel Boone